The 1973–74 Liga Leumit season saw Maccabi Netanya win their second title. Benny Alon of Hapoel Haifa was the league's top scorer with 15 goals.

The bottom two clubs, Hakoah Ramat Gan (who had won the title the previous season) and Maccabi Haifa took part in a play-off group with the top four clubs from Liga Alef to decide promotion and relegation. The top two clubs would remain in/be promoted to Liga Leumit, whilst the bottom four would start the 1974–75 season in Liga Alef. At the end of the play-offs, Hakoah Ramat Gan retained their place in the top division, whilst Shimshon Tel Aviv were promoted with Maccabi Haifa being relegated.

Final table

Results

Promotion and relegation play-offs

References
Israel - List of final tables RSSSF

Liga Leumit seasons
Israel
1973–74 in Israeli football leagues